Qodratabad or Qadratabad, also rendered as Qudratabad, may refer to:
 Qodratabad, Fahraj, Kerman Province
 Qodratabad, Narmashir, Kerman Province
 Qodratabad, Rafsanjan, Kerman Province
 Qodratabad, Azadegan, Rafsanjan County, Kerman Province
 Qodratabad, Rigan, Kerman Province
 Qodratabad, Khuzestan
 Qodratabad, Semnan
 Qodratabad, Nehbandan, South Khorasan Province

See also